Frank Oberle Sr.  (born March 24, 1932) is a Canadian businessman and former politician.

Born in Forchheim near Karlsruhe, Germany, Oberle moved with his family to German-occupied Poland in 1941. There he was placed in a Hitler Youth indoctrination program. Later, he fled the Red Army advance, surviving on grass and stolen eggs while walking 800 kilometres to his home village in the Black Forest. Rejected by his relatives, he immigrated to Canada at the age of 19 and became a logger and then a gold miner.

Oberle entered municipal politics, becoming mayor of Chetwynd. He entered federal politics and was elected to the House of Commons of Canada in the 1972 general election as the Progressive Conservative Member of Parliament for Prince George—Peace River, British Columbia. He subsequently won re-election five times.

In 1985, Oberle became the first German-born federal Canadian cabinet minister when he became Minister of State for Science and Technology in Prime Minister Brian Mulroney's government. He was science minister when the Canadarm went into space as part of the Space Shuttle program. He later became Minister of State for Forestry, and then Minister of Forestry in 1990.

Oberle retired from Cabinet when Kim Campbell succeeded Mulroney as Prime Minister, and retired from politics with the dissolution of the 34th Canadian Parliament for the 1993 election.

In 2004, Oberle published a memoir of his World War II experiences, Finding Home: A War Child’s Journey to Peace (2004). A second memoir, A Chosen Path: From Moccasin Flats to Parliament Hill, was published in the same year.

His son Frank Oberle Jr. was elected to the Legislative Assembly of Alberta in the 2004 provincial election, and was appointed Solicitor General on January 13, 2010.

Electoral history

References

Bibliography

External links

1932 births
Living people
Mayors of places in British Columbia
Members of the 24th Canadian Ministry
Members of the House of Commons of Canada from British Columbia
Progressive Conservative Party of Canada MPs
German emigrants to Canada
Members of the King's Privy Council for Canada
Canadian loggers
Canadian miners
Hitler Youth members